Sitotroga is a genus of moths in the family Gelechiidae.

Species
Species are:
 Sitotroga cerealella (Olivier, 1789) Angoumois grain moth
 Sitotroga exquisita Bidzilya & Mey, 2011
 Sitotroga horogramma (Meyrick, 1921)
 Sitotroga psacasta (Meyrick, 1908)
 Sitotroga pseudopsacasta Ponomarenko & Park, 2007

Former species
 Sitotroga nea

References

 
Pexicopiini